Minnesota State Highway 84 (MN 84) is a  highway in north-central Minnesota, which runs from its         
intersection with Highway 371 in Pine River and continues north to its northern terminus at its intersection with State Highway 200 in Kego Township, four miles north of Longville.

The route is two lanes throughout except for a small portion in Pine River near its southern terminus at Highway 371.

Route description
State Highway 84 serves as a north–south route between the communities of Pine River and Longville in north-central Minnesota.

The highway passes through the Chippewa National Forest between Longville and State Highway 200.

Highway 84 has a junction with the eastern terminus of State Highway 87 about midway between Pine River and Longville.

The route is legally defined as Legislative Route 139 in the Minnesota Statutes. It is not marked with this number.

History
State Highway 84 was authorized in 1933.

A majority of the route was paved by 1940. It was completely paved by 1949.

Major intersections

References

084
Transportation in Cass County, Minnesota